Geodena is a genus of moth from the family Geometridae.

References

Natural History Museum Lepidoptera genus database

Ennominae